Vermont Route 78 (VT 78) is a  east–west state highway in northwestern Vermont, United States. It begins at U.S. Route 2 (US 2) in Alburgh near the New York and Canada–US borders, and runs southeast to VT 105 in Sheldon. It is one of two routes connecting the Vermont mainland to the Grand Isle area of Lake Champlain, the other being US 2 north of Burlington.

Route description
VT 78 begins at an intersection with U.S. Route 2 in Alburgh. It crosses Lake Champlain onto the mainland, and proceeds southeast into the village of Swanton. Upon entering the town, VT 78 intersects the western terminus of VT 36. The route crosses the Missisquoi River and immediately intersects U.S. Route 7. The two routes overlap very briefly, then VT 78 heads east through the village to an interchange with Interstate 89 at exit 21, just east of the village line in the town of Swanton. VT 78 continues northeast into the town of Highgate, meeting and briefly overlapping VT 207. VT 78 then continues southeast to its terminus at VT 105 in Sheldon.

Major intersections

References

External links

078
Transportation in Franklin County, Vermont
Transportation in Grand Isle County, Vermont